The Collaborator is the 2011 debut novel by Mirza Waheed. The novel is set on the Indian side of the Line of Control that separates Indian Kashmir from Pakistani Kashmir. The first-person narrator is a young man who ends up working for the Indian Army, counting the number of dead militants, killed in encounters, with the Indian army.

Reception
The book The Collaborator was featured in 2011 "Books of the Year" in The Telegraph, New Statesman, Business Standard and Telegraph India. It was also 2011 Guardian First Book Award finalist and  shortlisted for the 2011 Shakti Bhatt First Book Prize.

References

Novels set in India
Kashmir conflict in fiction
2011 debut novels
2011 Indian novels
Indian English-language novels
Indian political novels
Indian mystery novels
Penguin Books India books